The 1982 World Shotgun Championships was the 17th edition of the global shooting competition World Shotgun Championships, organised by the International Shooting Sport Federation.

Results

Men

Trap

Skeet

Women

Trap

Skeet

Medal table

See also
Trap World Champions
Skeet World Champions

References

External links

ISSF World Shooting Championships
World Shotgun Championships